Nisbet railway station served the hamlet of Nisbet, Scottish Borders, Scotland from 1856 to 1948, on the Jedburgh Railway.

History 
The station opened on 17 July 1856 by the Jedburgh Railway Company. There was a siding to the southeast and a level crossing to the north. The station closed on 13 August 1948.

References

External links 

Disused railway stations in the Scottish Borders
Former North British Railway stations
Railway stations in Great Britain opened in 1856
Railway stations in Great Britain closed in 1948
1856 establishments in Scotland
1948 disestablishments in Scotland